Atlante UTN also known as Potros Neza was  Mexican football team based in the city of Nezahualcóyotl,  México. It was a filial team as Atlante.

History
The team formed in 1988 when Correcaminos was bought when they were relegated from Primera division. They played one season in Segunda División de México in 1988-89 as they won the championship and were promoted.

In their inaugural season in 1988-89 they were able to win the Segunda División de México under the management of Víctor Manuel Vucetich. Although, they were unable to be in the Primera division because before the 1989-90 season they were bought and re branded as Veracruz.

In 2004, Potros Neza played in Primera division A. In Apertura 2004 they ended 5th place in group 3 with 19 points while in the Clausura 2005 
they were able to obtain 28 points. In the 2005-06 season they changed their name and city as Tampico Madero was revived.

For the 2006 season, in Tercera división another team was created in Nezahualcóyotl also with the name of Potros. Potros Neza would end up playing the final two times in Tercera división. The first were against Atlético Tecomán which they lost and the second was against Búhos de Hermosillo which ended in defeat by an aggregate of 4-2.

They were later renamed as Potros de Hierro de Neza and played in Group VI of the Tercera división.

In 2009, Group Pegaso changed Potros de Chetumal from Quintana Roo to Nezahualcóyotl so they could play in the new Liga de Ascenso as Atlante UTN.

On December 11, 2010 Monarcas Morelia and Atlante decided to switch the city of their filial teams. Mérida FC the filial team of Monarcas Morelia moved to Neza to become Toros Neza while Potros Neza would move Merida creating the new team Venados F.C. The team would play their first season as Neza UTN due to regulations of FMF.

Stadiums
Estadio Neza 86
 Potros Neza (1988-1989)
 Atlante UTN (2002-2010)

Honours
Segunda División de México:
1988-89
Tercera División de México:
Runner-up: Clausura 2004, Apertura 2006

References

External links

Atlético Morelia
Atlante F.C.